The 1913–14 City Cup was the twentieth edition of the City Cup, a cup competition in Irish football.

The tournament was won by Glentoran for the 5th time. They defeated Linfield 2–0 in a test match at Solitude after both teams finished level in the table.

Group standings

Test match

References

1913–14 in Irish association football